Caenagnathasia ('recent jaw from Asia') is a small caenagnathid oviraptorosaurian theropod from the Late Cretaceous of Uzbekistan.

Discovery
The type species Caenagnathasia martinsoni was named and described in 1994 by Philip J. Currie, Stephen Godfrey and Lev Nesov. The generic name is a combination of a reference to the species' placement in the Caenagnathidae, with Asia, the continent of its provenance. The specific name honours Gerbert Genrikhovich Martinson. The genus is based on holotype N 401/12457, a pair of fused dentaries of the lower jaws. The specimen was found near Dzharakuduk in layers of the Bissekty Formation, dating to the Turonian-Coniacian, around 90 mya, making it the oldest known caenagnathoid. A second specimen was referred to the species, N 402/12457, a right dentary of a slightly smaller individual. Both individuals were adult. In 2015, new material of Caenagnathasia was described. From the same site as the holotype, the material includes various vertebrae, a dentary, and a femur.

Description
Caenagnathasia is the smallest known oviraptorosaur and one of the smallest non-avian dinosaurs. Caenagnathasia would presumably have resembled other oviraptorosaurs, which were feathered, bird-like dinosaurs with beaked skulls, long necks, and long limbs. Recent studies suggest it was one of the more primitive members of the Caenagnathidae.

Classification
Caenagnathasia was originally assigned to the Caenagnathidae. It was even included in the definition of that clade published by Hans-Dieter Sues. It has been suggested however, that it might have a more basal position in the Oviraptorosauria, outside of the Caenagnathoidea. In 2015 after the description of new material, it was found that Caenagnathasia could confidently be referred to Caenagnathidae.

The below cladogram is based on that resolved in the description of Anzu.

See also
 Timeline of oviraptorosaur research

References

External links
Image of C. martinsonii at The Dinosauria

Caenagnathids
Late Cretaceous dinosaurs of Asia
Fossils of Uzbekistan
Bissekty Formation
Fossil taxa described in 1994
Taxa named by Philip J. Currie